Sankar generally refers to a Hindu god, Lord Shiva, and may also refer to:

People 

 Sankar (writer & director) (V R Sankar, born 1981), Malayalam  film director and writer
 Shankar–Ganesh (born 1943), Indian music director duo
 Sankar (writer) (Mani Shankar Mukherjee, born 1933), Bengali author
 Beni Sankar (born 1948), Guyanese cricketer
 C. Sankar, Indian politician
 Kayman Sankar (1926–2014), Guyanese rice magnate
 R. Sankar (1909–1972), former Chief Minister of Kerala, India
 Sankar Das Sarma (born 1953), India-born American theoretical condensed matter physicist

Others 

 Gauri Sankar, the second highest peak of the Rolwaling Himal
 Ponnar Sankar, an epic poem in the Tamil language
 Sankar Cement, a brand of cement manufactured by India Cements
 Sankar, Nepal, a village in Nepal
 Sankar Monastery, a Buddhist monastery in Ladakh, northern India

See also 
 Sankara (disambiguation)
 Shankar (disambiguation)
 Shankara (disambiguation)